San Agustín Canton is one of the cantons of the Enrique Baldivieso Province (or "San Agustín Municipality") in the Potosí Department in south-west Bolivia. During the census of 2001 it had 567 inhabitants.  Its seat is San Agustín which is also the capital of the Enrique Baldivieso Province with a population of 533 in 2001. It lies at the Turuncha River.

References

External links
 San Agustín Municipality (= Enrique Baldivieso Province): population data and map

Cantons of Potosí Department
Cantons of Bolivia